Keith Lamb (born 9 January 1952) is an English-born Australian musician who was the lead singer and founding member of the 1970s glam rock band, Hush. He had been singing since the age of 10 years old, fronting English bands including Mr. Toad, The Case and Sleepy Talk. Mr. Toad supported UK acts including the Who and the Equals.

Lamb emigrated to Australia in 1970 with his school friend, Hush guitarist Robin Jackson.

Career
Lamb co-wrote Hush's music with guitarist Les Gock. He was one of Australia's better known front men of the 1970s, along with Bon Scott. On the passing of Scott, Lamb was considered as a replacement. Lamb lived for performing and was heartbroken when Hush split up. He went on to produce the work of bands Airport, Larry, and the Keith Lamb Band, but none had the commercial success of Hush. He also produced the albums Pioneers (platinum) and "Jesus Christ Superstar Choir Sing Carols". Lamb has mentored and supported many up-coming artists, including Sharon O'Neill. He appeared in the Australian musical "Jesus Christ Superstar", as Anas the Priest.

Lamb has also written songs for other artists, including top ten hits for Status Quo with "Ol' Rag Blues", "Over the Edge" and "I Want the World to Know".

Lamb performs at solo gigs, such as the Lifeline Concert in Cairns. He remains involved creatively with music, art, and sculpture and is a partner in the embroidery company Rajmahal. He has two children and five grandchildren. Lamb is also the co-author of the game, The Art of Conversation.

He lives in Bendigo, Victoria.

Countdown Spectacular

In 2006 Keith Lamb performed with other members of his band, Hush, as part of the Countdown Spectacular Tour under the auspices of Michael Gudinski. 
The first tour was staged from June to August 2006. It featured mainly Australian artists and groups, some re-forming specially for the tour, plus several international artists now living in Australia.

References

1952 births
Living people
Australian male singers
Australian record producers
Australian songwriters
English emigrants to Australia
People from Bendigo